In chemistry, the trigonal prismatic molecular geometry describes the shape of compounds where six atoms, groups of atoms, or ligands are arranged around a central atom, defining the vertices of a triangular prism.

Examples

Hexamethyltungsten (W(CH3)6) was the first example of a molecular trigonal prismatic complex. The figure shows the six carbon atoms arranged at the vertices of a triangular prism with the tungsten at the centre. The hydrogen atoms are not shown.

The complex Mo(S−CH=CH−S)3 is also trigonal prismatic, with each S−CH=CH−S group acting as a bidentate ligand with two sulfur atoms binding the metal atom. Here the coordination geometry of the six sulfur atoms around the molybdenum is similar to that in the extended structure of molybdenum disulfide (MoS2).

References

Stereochemistry
Molecular geometry